is a railway station in Izumo, Shimane, Japan, operated by West Japan Railway Company (JR West).  of the Ichibata Electric Railway is attached to the JR West station.

Lines
Izumoshi Station
West Japan Railway Company (JR West)
Sanin Main Line
Taisha Line - closed in 1990
Dentetsu Izumoshi Station
Ichibata Electric Railway
Kita-Matsue Line

Station layout

Adjacent stations

|-
!colspan=5|JR West

|-
!colspan=5|Ichibata Electric Railway

Railway stations in Shimane Prefecture
Sanin Main Line